The Woman and the Rose (Arabic: المرأة و الوردة) is a novel by the novelist Mohamed Zafzaf published in 1972. It was ranked among the hundred best Arabic novels until the end of the twentieth century.

The novel is one of Mohamed Zafzaf's first novels, it is considered largely important because it followed very important paths after the development of the modern Moroccan novel.

Events 
The novel, The Woman and the Rose, caused controversy among conservative critics because it discussed controversial topics such as sex and self. The events of the novel speak specifically about Mohammed Zafzaf, who was decimated by poverty and emigrated to Spain to escape unemployment. Zafzaf found that reading books does not bring money, and believed that emigration would improve his condition and allow him to escape a life of poverty and hunger.

He started a journey in search of money, but like other young Arabs, he craved a different life away from worries, and this causes him to go to Torremolinos where he encounters a world of sex, booze, and homosexuality shows that Mohammed was ready for this kind of life. Zafzaf seemed to highlight one thing, which is that the young Arab immigrant lives in Europe in order to revive his unbridled desire, freed from the shackles of oppression that bind him in the midst of his Arab society. It is the ignorance of self and exploration hidden by a society surrounded by the principles of religion, customs, and traditions. Therefore, once he arrives, he chooses a lifestyle of freedom, but despite this absolute freedom in an open European Society, the young Arab immigrant remains oppressed under the stress of alienation. This fatal strangeness is a main theme that Zafzaf puts forward in "The Woman and the Rose".

The title 
The novel The woman and the Rose is a compound title of two ideas, perhaps because Zafzaf made the woman in this novel the focus of attention, as some critics have stated. The writer illustrated underrepresented parts of the world and also introduced them to the suffering of Arab society. In its pages, the novel narrated an autobiography of the writer revealing his interest in the lower worlds of the socially marginalized and the both intellectually and psychologically oppressed Moroccan society.

Criticism 
Idris Al – Naqouri, a university researcher and critic, commented on the experience of Mohammed Zafzaf, stressing that this experience requires reconsideration. Whether in terms of applied critical analysis, or in terms of identifying the concepts of personality, plot, and facts in it, which is close or far from the idea of naturalization, and from the theory of receiving.

As for the study of The Woman and the Rose by the author Mohammed Zafzaf he said, "it is a novel that includes a moment of enlightenment. As if it were a discharge from a supposed depression, in which all the differences, all the similarities, all the matches come together, interact."

Noureddine Darmoush dealt with a number of his novels, such as The back Neighborhood,  The snake and the Sea, in addition to his early novel The woman and the Rose. These novels represent, according to Noureddine, the moment of convergence between the Moroccan novel and the Arabic novel. In addition to its encounter with the international novel, as a result of the openness that Moroccan intellectuals and creators have adopted, thus, the novels published in the seventies of the last century were characterized by the character of freedom from traditions, and escape from the system of culture and morality.

Mustafa Jabbari, a university researcher, wrote a long study on what he called the aesthetics of Zafzaf's story formation, in which he explained: "There is an artistic thread that organizes the texts of the writer Mohamed Zafzaf, and this artistic thread includes people, places, language, and events, which leaves a special imprint on him that distinguishes him from other Moroccan writers, It makes his narrative a unique literary orientation, independent of itself, on several levels, the most prominent of which is the aesthetic level of his narrative effects, whether from short stories or novels."

The spread of the novel 
The novel The woman and the Rose has achieved a critical accumulation around it since it was published in the late seventies. The literary criticism in Morocco singled it out for reading and analysis, achieving a critical accumulation of multi-generational critics. In relation to the novel itself, the critical perspectives varied from one critic to another and sometimes the critic himself, especially since this novel poses questions and topic that tempt literary criticism at that time to experiment with approaches and employ critical concepts and sayings, specifically what is important of them are the topics of "gender", "self", "identity" and "the other".

References 

1972 novels
Arabic-language novels
Moroccan novels